Lahner is a surname. Notable people with the surname include:

Emile Lahner (1893–1980), Hungarian painter 
Franz Lahner (1893–1966), Austro-Hungarian pilot
György Lahner (1795–1849), Hungarian army general
Josef Lahner, Austrian para-alpine skier
Timothy Lahner (born 1966), South African rower